Chak Phra is a Buddhist festival that is celebrated annually in Southern Thailand and Northern Malaysia. The name Chak Phra could be translated as “Pulling the Buddha”, “pulling of the Buddhist monks”,  or “pulling of ceremonial Buddha image carriages”.

Chak Phra takes place in the eleventh lunar month of the traditional Thai lunar calendar on the first day of the waning moon. In the Western calendar it usually falls in the month of October. Because the festival is based on a lunar calendar, the exact dates when it takes place change every year. 

The largest celebration takes place in Mueang Surat Thani, along the Tapi River. This the festival lasts nine days and nine nights. Smaller celebrations also take place throughout the south including: Nakhon Si Thammarat, Phatthalung, Pattani, and Ko Samui.

Etymology

"Chak" means "to pull" and "Phra" can refer to a monk, god, or Buddha image.

Story

Once Buddha had returned to earth, a large crowd gathered to welcome him. He was offered large amounts of food and was invited to ride in a busabok throne.

Overview
Chak Phra is assumed to take place in India under the doctrine of Brahmanism which is a popularly used Buddha statue in a procession on various occasion. Later on, Chak Phra transferred to the Southern Thailand and Northern Malaysia and has been put into practice and became a traditional festival for nowadays. People believe that Chak Phra will cause rainfall during the rainy season because people who are in the ceremony are mainly farmers.

Description

There are two types for this festival. Pulling the Buddha on the land or in the river.
Pulling the Buddha Statue on the land is to invite the Buddha statue to the destination which is the temple. This festival is suitable for the temple which is far away from the river.
Dragging in the river is to invite the Buddha statue enshrined on the boat and then flock to the destination. This festival is suitable for the temple that is near the river.

Ceremonial floats

 land floats 
 river floats

Customs

The main activities during Chak Phra in Mueang Surat Thani include:

 Putting up donation trees in front of houses for the Buddhist monks. These donation trees are like Buddhist Christmas trees decorated with money, food, toiletries, and other items that the monks may need. There are over 2,000 registered donation trees around Mueang Surat Thani.
 Display of ceremonial land floats from over 100 local Buddhist temples
 Pulling of the ceremonial land floats during a morning parade
 Long-boat Races
 Ceremonial river floats
  Colourful displays of the Lord Buddha’s life cycle
 Eating the traditional boiled rice snack of “belief & generosity”

Khanom tom

Khanom tom (literally "boiled snack") is a Southern Thai snack made from sticky rice, coconut milk, sugar, and salt. The mixture is wrapped in young Mangrove Fan Palm leaves, formed into a triangle shape, and then boiled or steamed until cooked. To show their generosity to those who participate in the Chak Phra parade, the snack is usually made in large volumes by community members the day before the parade at various temples around town, the most prominent being Wat Tha Sai in Kanchanadit District, Surat Thani.

Outside of Southern Thailand, khanom tom is usually referred to as "khao tom luk yon", as “khanom tom” is also the name of Central Thailand snack made from glutinous boiled rice balls covered in shredded coconut.

References

Buddhist festivals in Thailand
Malaysian culture